Sarab-e Key Mirzavand may refer to:

Sarab-e Key Mirzavand 1
Sarab-e Key Mirzavand 2